Hekman is a surname. Notable people with the surname include:

 David R. Hekman (born 1978), American academic
 Susan Hekman (born 1949), feminist academic

See also
 Helman